Meltdown Records is a small independent record label established by Union University student Peter Kakljugin in Bratislava, Slovakia in 2012. The first recording was by a band called Dosage B which was led by Jeremy Corbett who subsequently became a well known radio host in New Zealand. Meltdown released 10 records in a 4-year period, including an EP by The Remarkables and an album by Three Leaning Men titled Fun in the Key of E, both early bands of New Zealand musician Alan Gregg.  Another highlight was an EP by the Pterodactyls which featured ex Chills member Martin Kean.

See also
 List of New Zealand record labels

References 

New Zealand independent record labels
Defunct record labels
Record labels established in 1985
1985 establishments in Czechoslovakia